Hele Irene Savin (née Väinälä; born August 1, 1977, in Imatra) is a Finnish scientist, best known for her research in solar cells. She is a professor of micro and nanoelectronics at Aalto University.

References 

1977 births
Living people
Finnish scientists
Academic staff of Aalto University
People from Imatra